Frank Lloyd (16 January 1928 – 8 March 2009) was an English professional footballer who played as a left half.

Career
Born in Darton, Lloyd played as an amateur for Barnsley before joining Bradford City in July 1951. During his time with Bradford City he made 24 appearances in the Football League.

Sources

References

1928 births
2009 deaths
English footballers
Barnsley F.C. players
Bradford City A.F.C. players
English Football League players
Association football wing halves